Vedanta Societies refer to organizations, groups, or societies formed for the study, practice, and propagation of Vedanta, the ultimate aim of Vedas. More specifically, they "comprise the American arm of the Indian Ramakrishna movement", and refer to branches of the Ramakrishna Order located outside India.

Carl Jackson in his book, Vedanta for the West stated that, "Vedanta came to America in the form of Vedanta societies", starting with the appearance of Swami Vivekananda at the Parliament of Religions in Chicago in 1893 and his founding of the New York Society in 1894.

Branches of the Ramakrishna Order located outside India are under the spiritual guidance of the Ramakrishna Order. The work of the Vedanta Societies in the west has primarily been devoted to spiritual and pastoral activities, though many of them do some form of social service. Many of the Western Vedanta societies have resident monks, and several centers have resident nuns. The first Vedanta Society outside India was founded by the Indian Hindu monk Swami Vivekananda in New York in November 1894. In 1900, on Swami Vivekananda's second trip to the west, he established the San Francisco Center. Other direct disciples of Ramakrishna who came with Vivekananda to American includes Swamis Turiyananda, Saradananda, Trigunatitananda, and Abhedananda.

History 
Swami Vivekananda, the founder of the Ramakrishna Vedanta movement in the West, came to the United States to represent Hinduism at the 1893 Parliament of Religions in Chicago, where he gave his celebrated greeting to the audience, "Sisters and Brothers of America!". Following his success at the Parliament, he spent two years lecturing in various parts of eastern and central United States, appearing chiefly in Chicago, Detroit, Boston, and New York. For two months, starting in June 1895, he conducted private lectures to a dozen of his disciples at Thousand Island Park.

The first Vedanta Society, the Vedanta Society of New York, was founded by Swami Vivekananda in November 1894 on his first trip to the West. In 1897 Vivekananda sent Swami Abhedananda to lead the organization. On Vivekananda's second trip to the west he founded the Vedanta Society of Northern California in San Francisco. Vivekananda spent three months in the Bay Area teaching Vedanta and attracting serious students. Before returning to India he told his followers he was sending Swami Turiyananda, "I have lectured to you on Vedanta; in Turiyananda you will see Vedanta personified. He lives it every moment of his life. He is the ideal Hindu monk, and he will help you all to live pure and holy lives."

Major Vedanta Societies in the West

Vedanta Society of New York

After Swami Vivekananda's celebrated appearance at the 1893 Parliament of Religions in Chicago, he went on a speaking tour of the mid-west and east coast of the United States. While in New York, he founded the first Vedanta Society in 1894. The pattern set by the New York Society has been carried forward with later centers, with a spiritual head from the Ramakrishna Order, and board of directors or trustees for managing the business of the center, for the education and ministering of the lay devotees, often referred to as students of Vedanta.

In 1895, Vivekananda broke off his speaking tour and held a 6-week retreat at Thousand Island Park, NY to train and initiate his first disciples, who would carry on the work after he returned to India. In 1897, Swami Abhedananda came from India to take over the work in New York, and for the first two decades of the 20th Century was the "...best-known Asian religious teacher in the United States". In 1921, the current location of the Society was able to be purchased through a gift by Miss Mary Morton, who was the daughter of the ex-Governor of New York, at 34 West Seventy First Street. Notable swamis who were the head of the NY Center include, Swami Paramananda, Swami Bodhananda (1906–1950), Swami Pavitrananada (1951–1977), Swami Tathagatananda (1977–2016), and the current head of Center is Swami Sarvapriyananda.

Vedanta Society of Northern California
 On Swami Vivekananda's second trip to the United States, in 1900, he founded the Vedanta Society of San Francisco and called for a fellow direct disciple of Ramakrishna, Swami Trigunatitananda, to take charge of the center. It was under Trigunatitananda that was advertised as, "the first Hindu Temple in the Whole Western World". The unique architecture of the Hindu temple served an active role in the cultural contact.

The temple survived the 1906 San Francisco Earthquake, but in 1914 a, "demented follower had exploded a homemade bomb in the Hindu temple, fatally injuring Trigunatita". There was a series of swamis in charge until Swami Ashokananda took over in 1932 and continued until his death in 1969. During Ashokananda's time he greatly expanded the Northern California center to include a huge retreat in Olema, Marin Country, CA, a temple in Berkeley, CA, a temple in Sacramento, a convent in San Francisco, and another convent in San Rafael, CA. In 1959 he dedicated a greatly expanded "New Temple" at Fillmore and Vallejo.

Vedanta Society of Southern California
The Vedanta Society of Southern California was founded by Swami Prabhavananda in 1930, originally located in the home of a disciple, that became the future Hollywood Vedanta Temple. The society struggled in the early years, but by the late 1930s, the Swami started to attract notable authors and intellectuals, who were curious about the ancient Vedanta philosophy, and wanted to hear more from an adept. In 1938 a formal temple was built on the former rose garden of the home. By the early 1950s Aldous Huxley, Christopher Isherwood, and Gerald Heard had joined the editorial board of the Society's journal, Vedanta In the West.<ref>Vedanta In the West January 1951 – December 1962 (shortly after Huxley's death)</ref> The Swami established Vedanta Press, which oversaw the publication of books that would become standard textbooks for college-level courses, including The Spiritual Heritage of India and the Bhagavad Gita – The Song of God, translated by the Swami and Christopher Isherwood, with an introduction by Aldous Huxley. The translation was hailed as a literary translation, rather than literal. Time Magazine reported the book is a "distinguished literary work... simpler and freer than other English Translations".

In the early 1940s, Gerald Heard decided to establish his own monastery in Trabuco Canyon, in Orange County, Southern California, to practice intense spiritual exercises with a strict and physically demanding schedule, feeling that Prabhavananda was too lax. Aldous Huxley spent six weeks there working on his Perennial Philosophy. However, there were not enough followers to support the effort, so in 1949 he donated the entire property, buildings and furnishing to the Vedanta Society of Southern California, which became the Ramakrishna Monastery.

Prabhavananda was head of the center until his death on July 4, 1976. Swami Swahananda, who had been the head of the Berkeley Society took over and was head of the center until his death in 2010. Swami Sarvadevananda continues as the spiritual leader to the present.

Sub-centers
Ramakrishna Monastery, Trabuco Canyon

Vedanta Temple and Sarada Convent in Santa Barbara

Vedanta Center of Greater Washington DC, Maryland

The Cen­ter was established in April 1997 as an extension of the Vedanta Soci­ety of South­ern Cal­i­for­nia under the lead­ership of Swami Swahananda and spir­i­tual guid­ance of the Ramakrishna Math and Ramakrishna Mission, with headquar­ters at Belur Math, Howrah, West Bengal, India.

The head of the center, is Swami Sarvadevananda, minister of the Vedanta Society of Southern California. Swami Swahananda was the founding minister of the center, and was its head from 1997 to 2012.  Three monks of the order: Swamis Atmajnanananda, Brahmarupananda, Chidbrahmananda and Brahmacharya Kumar are in residence.

Swami Atmajnanananda, currently the resident minister at the Vedanta Center of Greater Washington, DC, in Silver Spring, Maryland, USA.
He is a scholar in Indian philosophy and traveled extensively throughout India and Bangladesh; contributed various articles and translations to some of the books and magazines of the Ramkrishna order. One of his articles was published in Living Wisdom: Vedanta in the West. He also authored Jiva Gosvamin's Tattvasandarbha: A Study on the Philosophical and Sectarian Development of the Gaudiya Vaisnava Movement, published by Motilal Banarsidass in 1986 under his pre-monastic name.

Swami Atmajnanananda was a significant critic of Jeffrey Kripal's book Kali's Child.

Ramakrishna-Vivekananda Center, New York

The Ramakrishna-Vivekananda Center located on the upper East Side of Manhattan Island was founded in 1933 by Swami Nikhilananda, when he and a group of followers broke off from the Vedanta Society of New York, while still maintaining its affiliation with the Ramakrishna Order in India.

The center has a main temple and monastery in New York City and a retreat property at Thousand Island Park on the Hudson, where Swami Vivekananda stayed for 7 weeks in the summer of 1895. Swami Nikhilananda produced some of the most important English translations of Vedanta scripture and literature including, The Gospel of Ramakrishna. Notable students of the Swami include Joseph Campbell (who helped edit the Gospel) and J.D. Salinger, who began his association with the Swami shortly after returning from WWII.

After Nikhilananda's death in 1973. Swami Adiswarananda took over, until his death in 2007. Currently, Swami Yuktatmananda heads the center.

Vedanta Society of St. Louis

The St. Louis Vedanta Society was founded by Swami Satprakashananda (1888–1979) in 1938. The Swami was a monk of the Ramakrishna Order and a disciple of Swami Brahmananda (considered to be the spiritual son of Ramakrishna). The swami was a sought-after scholar and wrote several books on Vedanta. He was recommended by Aldous Huxley to a young Huston Smith who was moving to St. Louis in 1947, as someone who could teach Vedanta Philosophy in depth. Huston Smith took weekly tutorial sessions with the Swami for a decade, which became the foundation of the course, the TV Series and Book, all titled, The Religions of Man''.

When the Society wanted to buy a building in a prominent and prestigious Church Row neighborhood in St. Louis, the swami was denied, as he had "brown skin", so Huston Smith and his wife Kendra bought the property and then turned it over to the society.

Swami Chetanananda was the assistant minister under Swami Prabhavananda at the Vedanta Society of Southern California from 1971 to 1979. As Satprakashananda's health declined, Chetanananda was assigned to St. Louis as the assistant there.

After Satprakashananda died, Swami Chetanananda became the head of the center, and continues in that role to today. Chetanananda continued the St. Louis Center's tradition of writing and translating important books on Vedanta and the early founders of the Ramakrishna Order. Chetanananda is, "One of the movement's most scholarly swamis".

Vedanta Society of Portland

An early attempt to start a Portland Vedanta study group in 1925 was initiated by Swami Prabhavananda, who had been the assistant in the San Francisco Center, but the group disbanded when Prabhavananda went on to establish the Vedanta Society of Southern California in 1930. Swami Devatmananda established a permanent Center in 1932 and acquired the large retreat property 20 miles outside of Portland. Swami Aseshananda, who had been the assistant minister under Swami Prabhavananda in Hollywood, took over in 1955 and remained in charge until his death in 1996. In Aseshananda's later years, in his 90s, he was the most senior monk in the Ramakrishna Order and the last living monastic disciple of Holy Mother, Sri Sarada Devi, the wife of Sri Ramakrishna.

Similar organizations 
The term "Vedanta Society" generally refers to branches of the Ramakrishna Order. Other societies, groups, organizations, and institutes which are aligned with this mission and goal of teaching Vedanta include the following, but are not limited to: 
 Chinmaya Mission
 International Vedanta Society

References

Further reading

External links to Vedanta Societies in the United States

External links to Vedanta Societies in Canada
Vedanta Society of Calgary
Vedanta Society of Toronto
Vivekananda Vedanta Society of British Columbia

Hindu organizations
Ramakrishna Mission